Kremena Stancheva (1941–2013) was a Bulgarian folk singer.

References

External links 
Official site

1941 births
Bulgarian folk singers
2013 deaths
20th-century Bulgarian women singers